Felix Nikolaevich Strok (23 October 1931 – 20 February 2022) was a Russian diplomat. He served as Ambassador of the USSR and Russia to Nepal from 1990 to 1992.

Strok died on 20 February 2022, at the age of 90.

References

1931 births
2022 deaths
Russian diplomats
Soviet diplomats
Ambassadors of the Soviet Union to Nepal
Ambassadors of Russia to Nepal